Kryptobaatar and also known as Gobibaatar or Tugrigbaatar is an extinct mammalian genus dating from the Upper Cretaceous Period and identified in Central Asia. This animal was a member of the extinct order of Multituberculata within the suborder Cimolodonta, and was a member of the family Djadochtatheriidae. It lived contemporaneously with some of the dinosaurs. Its skull had a length of perhaps 3 cm.

The generic name Kryptobaatar is derived from Greek : kruptós, "hidden," (alludes to the ventral position of infraorbital foramen) and Mongolian : baatar, "hero" (alludes to the name of the capital of Mongolia, Ulan Baatar). The specific name dashzevegi is named in honour of Mongolian palaeontologist Demberelyin Dashzeveg. The derivation of its synonym Gobibaatar parvus is Gobi (occurring in the Gobi Desert, Mongolia) and baatar ("a hero", the same as Kryptobaatar). Another synonym Tugrigbaatar saichanensis is a generic name derived from the Toogreeg and Ulan Baatar, and a specific name derived from a Gurvan Saykhan mountain range.

Species identified
 
 Kryptobaatar dashzevegi . At Djadokhta Formation, Ukhaa Tolgod, Tögrög Shiree and Bayan Zag or Baruungoyot Formation, Red beds of Hermiin Tsav, Mongolia. Stage: lower Campanian or Upper Cretaceous. The skull has a length of perhaps 3 cm. The front teeth look impressively sharp and not much like those of a strict vegetarian. Gobibaatar parvus  and Tugrigbaatar saichanensis  are now treated as  synonyms of K. dashzevegi by Kielan-Jaworowska et al. (2003).
 Kryptobaatar mandahuensis . At Bayan Mandahu Formation, Urad Houqi Banner, Inner Mongolia, China. Based on several well-preserved skulls. This location is about the same stage as the Djadokhta Formation of Mongolia, Campanian (Upper Cretaceous).

Biology
Kryptobaatar was a hopping species, similar to a modern Jerboa. It is thought to have been a carnivory-oriented omnivore.

Notes

References
 Kielan-Jaworowska Z & Hurum JH (2001), "Phylogeny and Systematics of multituberculate mammals". Paleontology 44, p. 389-429.
 McKenna MC & Bell SK, (1997), Classification of Mammals Above the Species Level. Columbia University Press.
 
 
 
 

Cimolodonts
Cretaceous mammals
Extinct mammals of Asia
Djadochta fauna
Prehistoric mammal genera